Om tårar vore guld is a song written by Agnetha Fältskog and recorded by Fältskog. Fältskog's rendition was released as a single in March 1970, and also appeared on her album Som jag är the same year. The song charted at Svensktoppen for weeks between 12 April and 19 July 1970, peaking at third position.

Cover versions
In 1971, the song was recorded in Danish as "Hvis tårer var guld" by Danish singer Susanne Lana. The Danish lyrics were written by Lana herself and Arne Bendiksen. The song ended 12th on the Danish year end chart of 1971. 
In 1990, the song was recorded by Stig Lorentz with Diana Thylin on the album Stig Lorentz med Diana.

References 

1970 singles
Agnetha Fältskog songs
Songs written by Agnetha Fältskog
Swedish-language songs